Coal Springs is a ghost town in Perkins County, in the U.S. state of South Dakota. The GNIS classifies it as a populated place.

History
Coal Springs was laid out in 1908, and named for the fact the community was located in a coal mining district. A post office called Coal Springs was established in 1909, and remained in operation until 1954.

References

Ghost towns in South Dakota
Unincorporated communities in Perkins County, South Dakota
Unincorporated communities in South Dakota